Mu Zi (born 9 January 1989) is a Chinese female table tennis player. She is a two-time finalist in mixed doubles event at the World Championships. In 2015, she reached the semifinal of her first women's singles event at the World Championships and in 2019 she won with Chen Ke the Hong Kong Open Women's Doubles.

References

1989 births
Living people
Chinese female table tennis players
People from Fushun
Table tennis players from Liaoning
World Table Tennis Championships medalists